Barbara Haas was the defending champion but chose not to participate.

Lea Bošković won the title, defeating Noma Noha Akugue in the final, 7–5, 3–6, 6–4.

Seeds

Draw

Finals

Top half

Bottom half

References

External Links
Main Draw

Ladies Open Hechingen - Singles
2022 Singles